Noel 'Noelie' Crowley (born 1962 in Waterford City) is an Irish former hurler who played for his local club Roanmore and at senior level for the Waterford county team.

Crowley is still involved in Roanmore GAA and officiates as a GAA umpire for Waterford referee Michael Wadding.

References

External links
Hoganstand.com article

1962 births
Living people
Hurling forwards
Hurling umpires
Munster inter-provincial hurlers
Roanmore hurlers
Sportspeople from Waterford (city)
Waterford inter-county hurlers